Steven Hall (born 1975 in Derbyshire) is a British writer. He is the author of The Raw Shark Texts, lead writer of the video game Battlefield 1,  and writer on Nike's World Cup short film The Last Game.

His debut novel, The Raw Shark Texts won the 2008 Somerset Maugham Award and a 2007 Borders Original Voices Award, and was shortlisted for the 2008 Arthur C. Clarke Award. The book has been translated into 29 different languages, and a screenplay for a film adaptation has been written by Simon Beaufoy (Slumdog Millionaire).

Hall has written for Granta Magazine and Lonely Planet. He has also written scripts for Doctor Who radio dramas and was the lead writer for the video games Crysis 3, Ryse: Son of Rome, Battlefield 1, and Battlefield V.

In 2007, Hall was named as one of Waterstone's "25 Authors for the Future". In 2010, Hall was named as one of the best 20 novelists under 40 by The Daily Telegraph. In 2013, Hall was named as one of Granta′s Best of Young British Novelists 2013 out of 20 novelists listed in total.

Works

Novels 
 The Raw Shark Texts (2007)
 Maxwell's Demon (2021)

Short Stories
 "Stories for a Phone Book," in New Writing 13 (2005)
 "What I Think About When I Think About Robots," in Granta 109: Work (2010)
 "The End of Endings," in Granta 123: Best of Young British Novelists 4 (2013)

Computer Games
 Crysis 3 (2013)
 Ryse: Son of Rome (2013)
 Battlefield 1 (2016)
 Battlefield V (2018)

Radio Plays
 "The Word Lord," in Doctor Who: Forty-Five (2008)
 Doctor Who: A Death in the Family (2010)

Advertising
 The Last Game for Nike (2014)

Awards and prizes

Waterstones 25 authors for the Future (2007)
Borders Original Voices Award (2007) for The Raw Shark Texts
Somerset Maugham Award (2008) for The Raw Shark Texts
 Granta Best of Young British Novelists (2013)

References

External links
Steven Hall Official Site
Official Raw Shark Texts Site

1975 births
Living people
21st-century English novelists
People from Derbyshire
English male novelists
21st-century English male writers
People from Kingston upon Hull